Lyes Hafid Houri (born 19 January 1996) is a French professional footballer who plays as a midfielder for Nemzeti Bajnokság I club Fehérvár. 

Internationally, he represented France at several youth levels.

Club career
Houri is a youth exponent from Valenciennes FC. He made his Ligue 2 debut on 1 August 2014 against Gazélec Ajaccio in a 0–2 away defeat.

He joined Ligue 1 club SC Bastia in February 2015, on a 3.5-year contract. After lacking first-team playing time, he was loaned in February 2016 to third-division team ASM Belfort. He was once again loaned the following season to Eredivisie team Roda JC Kerkrade.

International career
Born in France to an Algerian mother and Moroccan father, Houri is eligible for all three national teams. He represented the former country at youth level, earning caps for the under-16, under-17 and under-18 sides.

Career statistics

Club

Honours
Viitorul Constanța
Cupa României: 2018–19
Supercupa României: 2019

Notes

References

External links
 
 
 

1996 births
Living people
Footballers from Lille
Association football midfielders
French footballers
Valenciennes FC players
SC Bastia players
ASM Belfort players
Roda JC Kerkrade players
FC Viitorul Constanța players
CS Universitatea Craiova players
Fehérvár FC players
Ligue 1 players
Ligue 2 players
Championnat National players
Eredivisie players
Liga I players
Nemzeti Bajnokság I players
French sportspeople of Moroccan descent
French sportspeople of Algerian descent
French expatriate footballers
French expatriate sportspeople in the Netherlands
Expatriate footballers in the Netherlands
French expatriate sportspeople in Romania
Expatriate footballers in Romania
French expatriate sportspeople in Hungary
Expatriate footballers in Hungary
Wasquehal Football players